Sir William Gerard (1518–1581) was an Elizabethan statesman.

William Gerard may also refer to:
 William Gerard (MP for Wareham) (fl. 1414–1421), English Member of Parliament for Wareham
 William Gerard (died 1584) (1520–1584), English Member of Parliament for Preston, and for Wigan
 William Gerard (died 1609), English Member of Parliament for Wigan
 William Gerard, 2nd Baron Gerard (1851–1902), British Army officer and nobleman
 William Tyrer Gerrard (1831–1866), botanist and plant collector